'Stop the Rot' is a campaign launched in October 2000 by the Liverpool Echo newspaper with the aim of rescuing and preserving the rich architectural heritage of Liverpool and the greater Merseyside area. The campaign was launched when part of the Casartelli Building in Hanover Street in Liverpool collapsed, and this building subsequently became the symbol of the campaign.

The first meeting of the 'Stop the Rot' committee was held in April 2001 and at that stage there were 11 sites listed by the campaign as most at risk. The programme mobilised public support and received support from leaders of Liverpool City Council and from English Heritage, and as a result in October, with financial assistance from English Heritage, the council appointed a full-time Buildings at Risk officer.

Added impetus for the campaign was created by Liverpool being named as the 2008 European City of Culture and a wish for the city to present the best image possible for the expected influx of tourists and visitors.

In 2011 the Creative Ropeworks Project won an award from the Georgian Group for effective preservation of Georgian architecture and the 'Stop the Rot' campaign was highlighted as part of Liverpool's bid.

Currently 16 sites remain within the focus of the campaign and at risk. These are as follows:

64/72 Seel Street
98-102a High Street, Wavertree
Buddleia Centre
Cheapside, Liverpool
St Luke's Church
Duke Street Terraces
Newsham Park Hospital
Scandinavia Hotel
Seel Street/Slater Street
Stanley Dock Tobacco Warehouse
Wellington Rooms
Welsh Presbyterian Church
White House Pub

Sites Formerly on the list 

Casartelli Building
Exchange Buildings
Fleet Street Warehouses
St Peter's Catholic Church
Stanley Buildings
St Andrew's Church
The Florence Institute for Boys
Royal Insurance Building

References

External links
'Stop the Rot' Campaign Site
Catherine Jones, "ECHO Stop the Rot campaign: We vow to fight on", Liverpool Echo 2 January 2009
Sandfield Tower
 The Bombed Out Church

English Heritage
Organisations based in Liverpool
 
Architecture in England